The Menu, is a 2015 television series produced by Hong Kong Television Network. The series is starred by Noel Leung, Catherine Chau, Kate Yeung and Gregory Wong, written by Pun Man-hung and directed by Ben Fong. The first episode premiered on 10 March 10, 2015. The plot revolves around the newspaper business.

The sequel was released on 4 August 2016 as a film.

Cast
 Noel Leung as Alma Wong, Chief Editor for Smart Post
 Janice Ting as young Alma Wong
 Catherine Chau as Fong Ying, News Editor for Smart Post
 Kate Yeung as Mallory Mak, Junior Reporter for Smart Post
 Gregory Wong as Lok Ka-fai
 Shek Sau as Eric Cheung, Alma's divorced husband
 Sam Chan as young Eric Cheung
 Benji Chiang as Kenny Wong
 Kwok Fung as Kwan Chi-wai
 Felix Lok as Simon Ting
 Dexter Young as Mok Wun-choi, News Editor for Smart Post
 Anita Chan as Emily Yuen
 Lee Fung as Ho Lai-wan
 Brian Wong as Sou Man-hong, a police officer and Fong Ying's friend
 Cherry Pau as Winnie Chow
 Rachel Lam as Noel Lee
 Homan Ho as Sam, Alma's assistant
 Jones Lee as Shek Chun-yin, Fong Ying's ex-boyfriend
 Alan Luk as Fu Wing-hang, episode 5 to 8
 Yu Mo-lin as Hang Mou, episode 5 to 8
 Wong Man-piu as Daniel Wan
 Eddie Li as Calvin, Simon's assistant
 Wu Kwing-lung as Wong Chi-fat, Kenny Wong's triad brother
 Leung Kin-ping as KY
 Chan On-ying as Yiu Yuk-ling, Mallory's mother
 Kong Fai as Ryan Ka, ICAC investigator
 Luvin Ho as Siu Yin-wah, ICAC investigator, episode 12
 Kathy Yuen as Flora Lau, Lok Ka-fai's ex-girlfriend
 Candy Chu episode 14
 Maggie Wong as Venus Cheung, Eric's daughter
 Oscar Chan as Chris Li, Venus's husband
 Eunice Ho as Katie Yung
 Casper Chan as CID, episode 20
 Mizz Eva as Ng Hei-tung, episode 23 and 24

Production
Filming started on 28 January 2013 and ended on 24 August 2013.

Sequel

Filming for the sequel started on 1 December 1, 2015 and was released on 4 August 2016. With Noel Leung leaving the cast, The Menu the film starred Gregory Wong, Catherine Chau, Kate Yeung and Ng Man-tat.

References

External links
 Official website

Hong Kong Television Network original programming
2015 Hong Kong television series debuts
2010s Hong Kong television series
Television series about journalism